Herbert Peter Sorg (December 19, 1911 – March 11, 1979) was a Speaker of the Pennsylvania House of Representatives and later a United States district judge of the United States District Court for the Western District of Pennsylvania.

Education and career

Born in St. Mary's, Pennsylvania, Sorg received a Bachelor of Laws from Duquesne University School of Law in 1935. He was in private practice of law in St. Mary's from 1935 to 1955. He was Republican member of the Pennsylvania House of Representatives from 1940 to 1953, serving as majority whip from 1945 to 1947, majority leader in 1947, and Speaker from 1947 to 1953.

Federal judicial service

On May 20, 1955, Sorg was nominated by President Dwight D. Eisenhower to a new seat on the United States District Court for the Western District of Pennsylvania created by 68 Stat. 8. He was confirmed by the United States Senate on July 29, 1955, and received his commission on August 1, 1955. He served as Chief Judge from 1975 to 1976, and assumed senior status on December 20, 1976. He was a Judge of the Temporary Emergency Court of Appeals from 1977 to 1979. He remained in senior status until his death on March 11, 1979.

References

Sources
 

1911 births
1979 deaths
People from St. Marys, Pennsylvania
Speakers of the Pennsylvania House of Representatives
Judges of the United States District Court for the Western District of Pennsylvania
United States district court judges appointed by Dwight D. Eisenhower
20th-century American judges
Republican Party members of the Pennsylvania House of Representatives
20th-century American lawyers
20th-century American politicians